Pleasanton station is a train station in Pleasanton, California served by Altamont Corridor Express (ACE) trains. It is located northwest of downtown Pleasanton adjacent to the Alameda County Fairgrounds. The station has a single side platform on the single track of the Union Pacific Railroad Oakland Subdivision.

History 

The station is located on the Union Pacific Railroad Oakland Subdivision, formerly the 1910-opened Western Pacific Railroad mainline. The Mission Revival-style station north of Rose Avenue, which served the California Zephyr until 1970, is no longer extant.

The now-abandoned Southern Pacific Railroad Niles Subdivision was constructed by a different Western Pacific Railroad through downtown Pleasanton in 1869. The first station burned on July 26, 1873; the Central Pacific Railroad replaced it with a one-story station, which was expanded in 1881. A larger station was constructed in 1895; the older station was moved to Second Street, where it remains as a private home. Passenger service ended in 1941; the newer station is now a restaurant.

A new station southwest of the former Western Pacific station site opened with the start of the Altamont Commuter Express service on October 19, 1998.

Bus connections
WHEELS local routes 53 and 54 service the station, plus the County Connection express route 92X which provides access to ACE from the San Ramon Valley to the north.

The 8 and 10R WHEELS routes connect to the Dublin/Pleasanton BART station.

References

External links 

 ACE stations information

Altamont Corridor Express stations in Alameda County, California
Pleasanton, California
Railway stations in the United States opened in 1910
Railway stations closed in 1970
Railway stations in the United States opened in 1998
Former Western Pacific Railroad stations